Bayless Senior High School is a public school located in St. Louis, Missouri.

References

External links
 School website
 DESE school directory

Public high schools in Missouri